XEJCC-AM is a radio station on 720 AM in Ciudad Juárez, Chihuahua. It is operated by Grupo Radio Centro and is known as La Z with a Regional Mexican format.

History
XEJCC received its concession on November 27, 1989. It operated on 1520 kHz, with a daytime power of 1,000 watts, and was owned by Ana Patricia Eulalia Núñez Cervera.

In 2006, Grupo Impulsor de Medios, owned by various executives of Radiorama, bought XEJCC. In March 2010, XEJCC was approved to move from 1520 to 720 kHz.

In October 2020, the station abandoned its separate format as El Fonógrafo to simulcast sister station XHEM-FM 103.5.

References

Radio stations in Chihuahua
Grupo Radio Centro